Alia carinata, common name the carinate dove shell, is a species of very small sea snail, a marine gastropod mollusc in the family Columbellidae, the dove snails.

Distribution
This species is found in the Eastern Pacific, from Alaska to Baja California, Mexico.

Description
The adult size of the shell of this species of dove snail can be between 6 mm and 10 mm in length. The body whorl is sometimes carinate (having a pronounced keel), sometimes less so, and sometimes not at all. The shell color is quite variable; it can also be one uniform color or patterned with two shades of color.

References

External links
 
 Hinds R. B. (1844-1845). Mollusca. In: The zoology of the voyage of H. M. S. "Sulphur", under the command of Captain Sir Edward Belcher, R. N., C. B., F. R. G. S., etc., during the years 1836-42. London: Smith, Elder and Co. v + 72 pp., 21 pls. [Pp. 1-24, pls. 1-7, July 1844; pp. 25-48, pl. 8-14, October 1844; p. i-v, 49-72, pl. 15-21, January 1845. ]
 Dall W.H. (1919). Descriptions of new species of Mollusca from the North Pacific Ocean in the collection of the United States National Museum. Proceedings of the United States National Museum. 56: 293-371
 Gould, A.A. & Carpenter, P.P. (1857 ["1856"). Descriptions of shells from the Gulf of California and the Pacific coasts of Mexico and California. Part II. Proceedings of the Zoological Society of London. 24: 198-208]
 https://www.biodiversitylibrary.org/page/30680230
 Reeve L.A. (1858–1859) Monograph of the Genus Columbella. In: Conchologia Iconica, vol. 11, pl. 1-37 and unpaginated text. L. Reeve & Co., London. [stated dates: pl. 1, May 1859; pl. 2-8, January 1858; pl. 9-12, April 1858; pl. 13-18, October 1858; pl. 19-23, November 1858; pl. 24-25, February 1859; pl. 26-37, April 1859 ]
 deMaintenon M.J. (2019). The columbellid species of the northeast Pacific coast from the Aleutian Islands to Cedros Island, Baja California (Neogastropoda: Columbellidae). Zoosymposia. 13: 160-183

Columbellidae
Gastropods described in 1844
Taxa named by Richard Brinsley Hinds